Ntinda is a location in northeastern Kampala, the capital city of Uganda.

Location
Ntinda lies in Nakawa Division, one of the five administrative divisions of Kampala. It is bordered by Kyambogo to the east, Nakawa to the south, Naguru to the west, Bukoto to the northwest, Kigoowa to the north, and Kiwatule to the northeast. The coordinates of Ntinda are 0°21'18.0"N, 32°36'52.0"E (Latitude:0.355004; Longitude:32.614437).

History
During the 1960s and 1970s, Ntinda was a small trading center with a few shops, a farmers market, and several housing estates for employees of the East African Railways.

After the regime changes in the country in the 1980s, Ntinda became attractive to the well-to-do, and upscale residential neighborhoods began to spring up in the area. One such residential neighborhood had so many Uganda Cabinet Ministers taking up residence that it became known as "Ministers Village". Gilbert Bukenya, a former vice president of Uganda, owns a home in the area. Ntinda has an upscale shopping mall called "Capital Shoppers City", with a supermarket, banks, shoe stores, a restaurant, and a cake-making business. Surface and underground parking are available, along with armed security.

Points of interest
The following points of interest are located in or near Ntinda:
Dr Kiremerwa's clinic. He was Uganda's first black medical doctor. Survived by Dr Brett Kiremerwa Kintu Paediatrician,  Natasha Nakimera K a Public Health Specialist and Dr. Frederick Magezi all grandchildren and physicians. 
Ntinda Vocational Training Institute - a Government Vocational Training institute under Ministry of Education and Sports (Uganda), supervised by the department of Business Technical Vocational Education and Training (BTVET).
St. Luke's Church (CoU) . 
 Ntinda Mosque
 St. Charles Lwanga Catholic Church
 Agape Baptist Church
 Ntinda Shopping Centre - A multi-story shopping complex with parking and handicapped access.
 Ntinda Police Station - A branch of the Uganda National Police
 Tuskys Supermarket (Ntinda)

See also
Kampala Northern Bypass Highway
Kampala Capital City Authority
Kisaasi
Banda, Uganda
St. Luke Anglican Church
Uganda National Examinations Board HQ
Ntinda Vocational Training Institute, Kampala Uganda

References

External links
Kampala City Guide
Ntinda Shopping Centre - Malls - Kampala Uganda - Ugabox.com
Ntinda vocational training institute martrys way ministers village

Neighborhoods of Kampala
Cities in the Great Rift Valley
Nakawa Division